Watermelon Creek is a stream in Anderson County, South Carolina.

The creek was named for the watermelons grown on its shores by a nearby Native American tribe.

References

Rivers of South Carolina
Rivers of Anderson County, South Carolina